Geografi og Kærlighed (Geography and Love) is a play by the Norwegian playwright Bjørnstjerne Bjørnson. It was written in 1885 and it premiered at the Christiania Theatre on October 21, 1885. Bjørnson later reworked the last act of the play in the winter of 1893–1894.

The main characters in the play are Professor Tygesen and his wife Karen.

The play appeared in an English translation by Edwin Björkman titled Love and Geography in 1914.

The play has been performed a number of times in Norway's leading theaters, and it was filmed by NRK's Television Theater department in 1975.

References

External links
 Editions from 1885, 1893, and 1955 at the National Library of Norway

1885 plays
Norwegian plays